Sadgamaya is a 2010 Malayalam film directed by Hari Kumar, starring Suresh Gopi, Navya Nair and Shweta Menon in the lead roles.

Synopsis
Yamuna who is preparing for the big day in her life that is for her marriage. In comes a letter from her psychiatrist Ravi Varman, who had treated her for schizophrenic disorder, three years ago. Ravi Varman now wants to meet her, as she is soon to witness some critical of the circumstances. Ravi Varman, according to his unsatisfied wife Jyothi, is more like a mentally challenged person than most of his patients, treating only one patient at a time, that too in an alien hill bungalow. Though the mental issues and associated unsettling hallucinations faced by Yamuna are confusing, Ravi Varman finds the root causes of continuous ‘vulture episodes’ through his travels into the subconscious mind and starts his treatments, finally to get the girl disowned by even her parents.

Cast
Suresh Gopi as Dr. Ravi Varman
Navya Nair as Yamuna
Shweta Menon as Jyothi
 P. Sreekumar
 Ambika as Yamuna's mother
 Lakshmipriya as Yamuna's sister

Soundtrack

The music was composed by M. Jayachandran, with lyrics written by Rafeeq Ahamed.

References

External links
 
 Nowrunning.com article
 Oneindia article

2010 films
2010s Malayalam-language films
Films scored by M. Jayachandran